Darren Carter is an American stand-up comedian, actor and impressionist. Carter has performed on The Tonight Show with Jay Leno, Comics Unleashed, Premium Blend on Comedy Central, and as a supporting character in the 2005 feature film Be Cool with John Travolta.

Early life
Darren Carter was born and raised in Fresno, California.

Personal life
Carter has been married to his wife Genie, since 1997. Together, they have a son.

Filmography

Film

Television

Video games

References

External links
 Official website
 

American male film actors
American stand-up comedians
Living people
Place of birth missing (living people)
Year of birth missing (living people)
20th-century American comedians
21st-century American comedians
Male actors from Fresno, California